Olympus Hills Shopping Center, located at 3900 Wasatch Blvd, Salt Lake City, Utah, was established in 1963, and is named after the mountain to the East.  It sits within the Olympus Cove in Millcreek, Utah.

History
Olympus Hills has been home to many different stores over the years, but the most memorable was Smith's Food and Drug (aka Smith's Food King). Smith's had leased the shopping center's largest space and was the key tenant. Then unexpectedly Smith's decided to use the facilities as storage only, leading to a long lawsuit between Olympus Hills Shopping Center and Smith's.  The long drawn-out fight took several years to sort out. This action left Olympus Hills on the brink of complete failure.  Barely hanging on, Olympus Hills slowly began to recover. As the only shopping center located of the I-215 belt route in Utah, it once again began to attract the attention of bigger clients. 

In 2004 the Shopping Center was put back on the hot seat, as a billboard was erected directly in front of the shopping center at a small gas station owned by another party.  The community was in an outrage, and instantly accused the shopping center of this action. The center defended itself from the onslaught of people protesting. Reagan sign company refused to respond to letters and phone calls. In return they instead posted US Marine Corps advertisements along with Air Force. Working hand in hand with the community leaders, legislation was agreed upon and the sign was finally removed. Once again the shopping center struggled a little, but it pushed forward much faster this time.

References

Real estate companies established in 1963
Retail companies established in 1963
Shopping malls in Utah
Buildings and structures in Salt Lake City
Tourist attractions in Salt Lake City